Samberigi Airport is an airfield serving Samberigi, in the Southern Highlands Province of Papua New Guinea.

It is a one-way airstrip on the slopes of Mt Murray.

References

Airports in Papua New Guinea
Southern Highlands Province